released as Trace Memory in North America, is a point-and-click adventure game developed by Cing and published by Nintendo for the Nintendo DS portable video game console.  A sequel, Another Code: R – A Journey into Lost Memories, was released for the Wii.

Players take on the role of Ashley Mizuki Robbins, a 13-year-old girl, as she searches for her father on the fictional Blood Edward Island. Gameplay revolves around solving puzzles, and is controlled using the DS touchscreen or D-pad.

Another Code received average critical response. Though praised for its implementation of the DS controls, its story and hand drawn artwork, many criticized the game's short length, unoriginal puzzles, and gearing toward a teenage audience.

Gameplay
Assuming control of Ashley Robbins, players navigate through 3D environments and attempt to solve puzzles. During movement, the touchscreen displays an aerial view of Ashley and her surroundings. The player can move Ashley using a point and click system, dragging the stylus across the screen, or using the D-pad. The top screen shows pre-rendered images of the player's current location. To solve puzzles encountered in the game, the player must use the touchscreen, or other DS capabilities, such as the DS microphone.

A device in the game called the DAS (renamed DTS in the North American release) allows the player to save and load, read messages in the form of DAS data cards, and examine photographs. The photographs come from the player's in-game camera which can take up to 36 photographs at a time. An inventory list is also available to store items for later use. The player will sometimes encounter non-player characters in the game; to initiate dialog with them, the player must tap the talk icon.

Story and setting
The events of the game take place on the fictional Blood Edward Island. The game's protagonist, Ashley Mizuki Robbins, is the daughter of Richard and Sayoko Robbins, researchers of human memory. After her parents mysteriously went missing in 1994, they were presumed dead. Consequently, Ashley was raised by her father's younger sister, Jessica Robbins, in the suburbs of Seattle. Around this time, Ashley begins to suffer from a recurring nightmare, in which she is hiding inside a closet as a child and witnesses someone getting shot. Eleven years later, two days before her fourteenth birthday, Ashley receives a package from her father containing a birthday card and a device called a DAS. The DAS, programmed to respond only to Ashley's biometrics, contains a message from her father, claiming that he is waiting for her on Blood Edward Island.

Blood Edward Island is an island located off the coast of Washington in the United States. The next day, the day before her birthday, Jessica and Ashley ride over to Blood Edward Island on a boat, but Ashley's father is not there to greet them. Jessica goes to look for him, but when she doesn't return, Ashley ventures out to search for both of them. While exploring the island, Ashley also befriends D, a ghost who has lost his memories. D is only visible to Ashley, and wants to learn the truth behind his death. Together they enter the Edward Mansion, each looking for answers to their own questions.

As they explore Edward Mansion, Ashley and D begin to learn the history behind the Edward family, who are rumored to have all died one after the other, resulting in the island's name. At the same time, they begin to unravel the mystery surrounding Ashley's father, Richard, and their invitation to the island. Ashley eventually discovers that her mother, Sayoko, was murdered on the night of her third birthday, her recurring nightmare being a vague memory of that night. She also learns about "Another", a device with the ability to replace someone's real memories with false ones, which was created by Ashley's parents while they worked as memory researchers at MJ Labs. Its purpose was to help those who have PTSD and other forms of psychological trauma, by replacing their traumatic memories. Richard has the memory of being Sayoko's murderer and suspects his memory was replaced. During his time alone on Blood Edward he had developed "Another II", which allowed someone's true memories to be verified and returned, and locked it to the DAS, allowing only Ashley to activate it. After she activates "Another II", Ashley is relieved to find out that her father's true memory of the night of her mother's murder was, indeed, altered to make him remember shooting her mother. She returns his real memory of that night.

Ashley and Richard end up confronting Bill Edward, an old friend of Richard and Sayoko, who was also a scientist. While holding Richard at gunpoint in a cave, Bill forces Ashley to remember the night of her mother's murder, and she realizes that Bill was the culprit. Bill had been in love with Sayoko, however, she was happily committed to Richard. After they had finished the development of "Another", Richard and Sayoko tried to keep it out of reach of those that might use it for malicious purposes, and Sayoko eventually gave birth to Ashley, making the decision to give up being a scientist for good, to focus on her husband and daughter. In his jealousy and his rage over Sayoko's "betrayal", Bill broke into their family home to steal back "Another", shooting Sayoko. Just as Bill is about to shoot Richard, D appears before him and tells him that he's "making Franny cry"; the shock causes Bill to fall down a nearby drop, to his death.

Depending on how much Ashley and D have discovered regarding D's memories and the Edward family, D will either not remember his death, and will, therefore, be cursed to wander the island alone, or he will. In the case of the latter, it is revealed that D's real identity is "Daniel Edward", a young boy from the Edward family. Daniel's uncle shot and killed his father in a tragic misunderstanding over inheritance. Having witnessed this, D ran in fear from his uncle into the cave, where he fell to his death; the last thing he saw was his uncle's outstretched hand, attempting to save him. After this incident, the uncle shot himself out of guilt, and his daughter, Franny, left the island, as the sole survivor of her family. She became the mother of Bill Edward. Having finally found his answers, D is able to depart to the afterlife in peace.

Richard and Ashley meet up with Jessica, and the three leave the island, to now be "together forever". If the player is using a new game plus save data, they will get a post-credit scene where Ashley receives a letter wishing her a happy "sweet sixteen", foreshadowing the events of the sequel.

Development
Another Code started development in February 2004, and was officially announced by Nintendo on October 7, under the working title Another. The first playable demo of the game debuted during the November 2004 Nintendo World Japanese tour. At a Nintendo retailer conference in January 2005, the release date was set for Japan on February 24. The release date for Europe was set on June 24, under the title Another Code: Two Memories. The game was showcased at E3 2005 under the title Trace Memory. It was released in North America on September 27.

Rika Suzuki, game designer and scenario writer for the game, said that she "prefer[s] stories that are emotionally moving", and that, "one thing that is reflected in my work is the idea of memories as a device for moving the story along. One of the things I try to acknowledge is the difference between a recollection and a memory". She said that "Another Code is set over the course of one day, and it's a very special day", and that something she finds interesting to portray in a story is "when you wake up in the morning, you could have an extraordinary day which will be memorable for the rest of your life". Additionally, she explained: "When [my father] was very young he lived in Shanghai, and because of the disease he became able to draw very detailed maps of the area, which he couldn't before. That stimulated me to think a lot more about memory". Suzuki's father had Alzheimer's disease.

Another Code was originally displayed from a quarter view, but was later changed to a top-down perspective due to difficulties with controlling the game using the stylus, and in an attempt to make it more user-friendly for players not used to a 3D game. Taisuke Kanasaki, the game's director and character designer, said that the development team always considers the relation a puzzle has to a game's story, and, "even if we could invent an amazing idea for a puzzle, it might not be adopted without a solid relationship with the story". Suzuki said she thought the burden on the programmers was quite large. Lead Programmer Kazuhiko Hagihara reportedly had disagreements with Kanasaki during the latter half of development. The game's protagonist, Ashley Robbins, was designed by Kanasaki to appeal to both male and female players. She was originally intended to be 17 years old, but her age was later changed to 14 by Suzuki.

Ann Lin of Nintendo of America's Product Development Department stated that there are several differences between Another Code'''s original Japanese text and the North American translation. She commented: "I think that a believable character, a believable person would have certain feelings of betrayal, not just acceptance. I wanted to explore that just a little. I think the [Japanese text] was a little more accepting, not really questioning the weirdness of meeting a ghost or any of the [strange] circumstances that had befallen her".

Suzuki later said the game had a large impact in Japan, and that "one thing that I am particularly proud of is that if you go into a games shop in Japan now there is an adventure corner, and that's something that we feel we've contributed to coming back". She also said that "the company feels that with our games you don't need the special skills required to play other games. There is no gender or age classification, it's just you and the story".

ReceptionAnother Code was the 123rd best-selling game of 2005 in Japan, with 105,452 copies sold. The game also placed 32nd on the list of best-selling DS games of 2005 in Europe, with around 15,000 copies sold in the United Kingdom.

The game received "average" reviews according to the review aggregation website Metacritic. In Japan, Famitsu gave it a score of one nine, one ten, and two eights for a total of 35 out of 40. The game was considered by many reviewers to be aimed at a younger audience, or "a good introduction to the graphic adventure genre". PJ Hruschak of CiN Weekly commented that some critics referred to the game as "Myst for Kids".

The game was praised for its story and graphics; Matt Wales of Computer and Video Games said: "From the gorgeous hand drawn artwork and gloriously detailed 3D environments to the intimate and expertly paced storyline, the game maintains a light and uniquely engaging atmosphere throughout". Jason Hill of The Sydney Morning Herald said the game possessed "a rich plot exploring themes of love, grief, ambition and memory [that] complements engaging characters", and Kristan Reed of Eurogamer remarked that "Another Code does a great job of structuring the game well to keep you guessing". GamesMaster described the graphics as "an enticing mix of cutesy anime portraits and lovely 3D environments", and Bethany Massimilla of GameSpot thought that "the 2D art in the game is where all the richness of detail is".

Jeremy Parish of 1UP.com complained that the game's puzzles were extremely unoriginal, with the comment that "the devices and gimmicks used to obstruct progress are so hoary that archaeologists have unearthed ancient clay tablets inscribed with Trace Memory puzzle solutions". This sentiment was echoed to lesser degree by several reviewers. However, Parish said that "maybe that's not entirely fair. The DS is. . .  [Nintendo's] attempt to branch out beyond traditional gamers; it's quite likely that the target audience for Trace Memory really is 13-year-old girls, just like Ashley". He ended the review by saying: "Trace Memory is the very definition of a safe, comfortable, middle-of-the-road experience".GamesMaster praised the game's control scheme as "absolutely brilliant" and "[the] best ever". They said that the implementation of DS capabilities would cause players to "re-evaluate the way you approach in-game puzzles", and that "the DS-specific puzzles are, without exception, uniformly fab". He noted that "more action-oriented gamers could well find Another's puzzles linear and obscure, constant backtracking frustrating". The game received praise for its interface from other reviewers: Reed called it "brilliantly implemented", and Wales said it was "fantastically slick".

The game's length garnered much negative response, as did its lack of replay value. Massimilla stated that "you could burn through the entirety of Trace Memory in about four or five hours in a single marathon session", and Craig Harris of IGN called it "very, very short for an adventure game". Wales thought that "there's little to encourage replay". The game was also criticized for its use of backtracking; several reviewers were irritated by the game design decision that "certain items can only be collected once you've found a use for them".Another Code was a nominee for GameSpot's 2005 "Best Adventure Game" award, which ultimately went to Fahrenheit. The editors wrote: "Trace Memory serves up an interesting story with a handful of inspired puzzles that are all too quickly conquered". In 2011, Adventure Gamers named Another Code the 60th-best adventure game ever released. In 2014, Another Code was named the 92nd greatest game released on a Nintendo console by Official Nintendo Magazine.

Ashley has appeared in every iteration of the Nintendo crossover fighting series Super Smash Bros., from Super Smash Bros. Brawl onwards as a Trophy or a spirit; her Another Code: R – A Journey into Lost Memories version appears in Super Smash Bros. for 3DS and Wii U and Super Smash Bros. Ultimate''. In Brawl, Ashley's aunt Jessica and the Captain also appear as their own trophies.

Notes

References

External links
 
 Official European website
 Official North American website (archived)
 Official Japanese website 
 

2005 video games
Cing games
Video games about ghosts
Nintendo franchises
Nintendo games
Nintendo DS games
Nintendo DS-only games
Point-and-click adventure games
Video games set in 1994
Video games set in 2005
Video games set in the United States
Video games set on fictional islands
Video games developed in Japan
Video games featuring female protagonists
Visual novels
Single-player video games